Samuel "Sam" Wesley Hall (March 10, 1937 – August 11, 2014) was an American Olympic silver medalist diver and politician who served as a member of the Ohio House of Representatives.

Early life and education 
He was born in Dayton, Ohio, where his father Dave was mayor. His brother, Tony P. Hall, was a politician and diplomat.

Hall began his athletic career began at Fairmont High School, where he was a two-time letterwinner in track and field. During high school, Hall set records for pole vaulting.

College 
In the fall of 1955, Hall enrolled at the Ohio State University, where he lettered in gymnastics, soccer, track and diving. As a trackman, Hall competed in the pole vault and javelin. During 1959–1960, Hall won two Big-Ten Conference championships, three NCAA championships, and three U.S. Amateur Athletic Union titles.

Career

1960 Olympics 
Hall won a silver medal at the 1959 Pan American Games and 1960 Summer Olympics. After the 1960 Olympics, Hall served with the United States Air Force and competed in athletics for them, eventually retiring due to a knee injury.

Politics
From 1964 to 1966, Hall served as a member of the Ohio House of Representatives.

Pro-Contra efforts
Hall later worked as an unpaid "volunteer counterterrorist," as Hall described himself, going to Central America to fight on the side of anti-communist forces as an advisor to the Nicaraguan Contras. He reentered the national spotlight again in late 1986 when he was captured by Sandinista National Liberation Front forces, which announced the capture of a "spy". Hall was freed after less than two months.

When interviewed by journalists regarding his "volunteer counterrorist" activity, Hall sometimes referred to himself by saying, "They call me the Evel Knievel of Dayton" or "Just call me Sammy of the Sinai."

Personal life 
Prior to his death, Hall worked as a real estate agent. Hall died in Florida on August 11, 2014, aged 77.

References

Further reading

1937 births
2014 deaths
American athlete-politicians
Members of the Ohio House of Representatives
American mercenaries
Sportspeople from Dayton, Ohio
Ohio State Buckeyes men's divers
Divers at the 1960 Summer Olympics
Olympic silver medalists for the United States in diving
American male divers
American people imprisoned abroad
Prisoners and detainees of Nicaragua
Medalists at the 1960 Summer Olympics
Pan American Games silver medalists for the United States
Pan American Games medalists in diving
Divers at the 1959 Pan American Games
Medalists at the 1959 Pan American Games